Kübra Kuş (born 9 November 1994) is a Turkish female water polo player, playing at the centre forward position. She is part of the Turkey women's national water polo team. She competed at the 2016 Women's European Water Polo Championship.

She is a member of Ege Water Sports and Tennis Club and also played volleyball.

References

1994 births
Living people
Turkish female water polo players
Place of birth missing (living people)
Competitors at the 2018 Mediterranean Games
Mediterranean Games competitors for Turkey